The Spain Sevens is an annual international rugby sevens tournament that was played as two back-to-back events on consecutive weekends in late January that year. The first event was held in Málaga at Estadio Ciudad de Málaga and the second was held  in Seville at Estadio de La Cartuja. These events were hosted  by the Spanish Rugby Federation as the third and fourth stops on the 2021–22 season of the World Rugby Sevens Series for national men's teams.

Results

See also
 Spain Women's Sevens

References

External links
Official website

 
Rugby union competitions in Spain
World Rugby Sevens Series tournaments
Rugby sevens competitions in Europe
Recurring sporting events established in 2022